Newton-by-the-Sea is a civil parish in the county of Northumberland in Northern England. The parish is about 8 miles northwest of Alnwick, and lies on the coast between the larger settlements of Embleton and Seahouses. Newton-by-the-Sea is in the parliamentary constituency of Berwick-upon-Tweed. The population of the parish in the 2011 United Kingdom Census was 212. The area of the parish is 	

There are two distinct settlements in the parish: High Newton-by-the-Sea (which, despite its name, is about half a mile inland) and the coastal Low Newton-by-the-Sea, owned by the National Trust. The area is notable for the diversity of birds to be observed. Just to the south is Embleton Bay.

Newton Hall is an 18th-century country house in High Newton-by-the-Sea. It is a grade II listed building and is today used as a hotel and wedding venue. The Ship Inn at Low Newton-by-the-Sea is an 18th-century pub with its own microbrewery. Brewing started in 2008, and over 20 different cask ales are produced.

The uninhabited island of Faggot lies about half a mile offshore from Newton.

References

External links

Civil parishes in Northumberland
Populated coastal places in Northumberland